Frederick W. Farnham  (November 30, 1860 – December 11, 1943) served as the  fortieth Mayor of Lowell, Massachusetts.

References

1860 births
1943 deaths
Mayors of Lowell, Massachusetts
Massachusetts Republicans